The 1964 Norwegian Football Cup was the 59th edition of the Norwegian annual knockout football tournament. The Cup was won by Rosenborg after beating Sarpsborg in the cup final with the score 2–1. This was Rosenborg's second Norwegian Cup title.

Third round 

|colspan="3" style="background-color:#97DEFF"|2 August 1964

|}

Fourth round

|colspan="3" style="background-color:#97DEFF"|23 August 1964

|}

Quarter-finals

|colspan="3" style="background-color:#97DEFF"|6 September 1964

|}

Semi-finals

|colspan="3" style="background-color:#97DEFF"|18 October 1964

|-
|colspan="3" style="background-color:#97DEFF"|Replay: 21 October 1964

|}

Final

Rosenborg's squad: Sverre Fornes, Knut Jensen, Kjell Hvidsand, Kåre Rønnes, Harald Gulbrandsen, Egil Nygaard, Tore Pedersen, Birger Thingstad, Tore Lindvåg, 
Eldar Hansen and Tor Kleveland.

References
http://www.rsssf.no

Norwegian Football Cup seasons
Norway
Football Cup